The Davey Tree Expert Company, also known as Davey Tree, is an American multinational employee owned corporation. The company's main services are tree care, commercial grounds, utility and consulting. It has employees throughout the United States and Canada.

Davey was the first and is the largest tree care company in North America. John Davey, its founder, started the company in 1880 and is considered the father of the science of tree surgery and arboriculture. It has been employee owned since 1979 and is the 8th largest such company in the U.S. Forbes named it as one of America's best employers.

Company headquarters are in Kent, Ohio. It provides services to homeowners, small and large businesses, public utilities, and local, state, and federal agencies through its arboriculture, horticulture, and environmental and consulting services.

History 
In 1873, John Davey at age 27 traveled from Europe to America and began working at Standing Rock Cemetery in Kent, Ohio. The cemetery let him experiment with the property's trees, shrubs and flowers. He planted hundreds of trees along the Kent streets and around homes in the community and performed some tree work. He wanted people to care about trees so wrote a book.

That book was published in 1901 known as "The Tree Doctor". John Davey was the President, and his son, Martin L. Davey, became the general manager and treasurer eight years later when The Davey Tree Expert Company was incorporated in 1909. By 1915, Davey Tree was growing and expanding; during the period from 1915 to 1920, the company expanded more than fivefold. Today, its sales are more than $1 billion.

Employee ownership 
The Davey Tree Expert Company has been employee-owned since 1979 and is the 8th largest employee-owned company in the U.S., according to data from the National Center for Employee Ownership. (The 2021 Employee Ownership 100 list includes the nation's largest companies that are at least 50 percent owned by an employee stock ownership plan or other broad-based employee ownership plan.) The list also names Davey as the largest employee-owned company in Ohio.

Environmental science 
John Davey established the Davey Institute of Tree Surgery in 1908. A training facility was staffed by experts and also provided employees with the skills and tools needed to advance tree science. Today, the company still provides basic tree science as the educational foundation for its employees.
 
Davey is building a new research and training facility at its home headquarters in Kent, Ohio. It's about 175 acres of property that will test how to build more sustainable landscapes as the world faces climate change. This property is known as the Davey SEED Campus. Some areas it plans to research are water management and pollinator habitat. Davey also made a deal with the Kent Board of Education to exchange a derelict elementary for some other property. The Kent school district made this deal according to its Superintendent. According to the company, scientists and technical advisers guide field service teams in diagnosing and prescribing products, application procedure, and pest and disease cultural practices.

The company partners with other organizations to promote the benefits of trees, such as the Arbor Day Foundation, American Forests, International Society of Arboriculture and the Tree Care Industry Association and programs like the National Register of Big Trees and fundraisers like Tour des Trees. It also partners with universities such as Kent State.

In 2013, it published its first corporate social responsibility report. The company has been involved in many projects to help care for the environment with initiatives such as i-Tree, software created by Davey and the USDA Forest Service used to quantify the benefit of trees, as well as helping the National Park Service care for the trees at the Flight 93 National Memorial. It also assists and helps clean up from natural disasters, such as Hurricane Rita and Hurricane Katrina. Hurricane Katrina created widespread tree damage prompting the International Society of Arboriculture, Davey Tree, and Urban Forest Strike Teams to deploy certified arborists into at least nine communities along the Mississippi/Louisiana Gulf Coast. Throughout September and October 2017, thousands of federal, state, and private agencies were deployed to areas that were impacted by hurricanes Harvey, Irma, Maria, and Nate. These first responders are there to help the people in the storm's path. However, Davey is part of another group of responders that go into storm-ravaged towns to aid the trees.

Service divisions 
According to Davey Tree, it operates in two segments, residential/commercial, and utility. It has research, technical support, and laboratory diagnostic facilities. The residential/commercial segment is involved in the treatment, preservation, maintenance, removal, and planting of trees, shrubs, and other plant life. The segment's services also include landscaping, grounds maintenance, tree surgery, as well as the application of fertilizers, herbicides, and insecticides. The utility services segment engages vegetation management around power lines, rights-of-way, and chemical brush control services; and natural resource management and consulting, forestry research and development, and environmental planning services.

About half the company growth in this century has come from mergers and acquisitions. The biggest was Illinois-based The Care of Trees in 2008.  Recently it has purchased S&S Tree and Landscaping Specialists, LMS and TGC Engineering

References

Further reading

Companies based in Ohio
Kent, Ohio
Privately held companies based in Ohio